The Arkansas State Red Wolves women's basketball team represents Arkansas State University in Jonesboro, Arkansas, United States. The school's team currently competes in the Sun Belt Conference. They play their home games at the First National Bank Arena.

History

The Red Wolves have never appeared in the NCAA Tournament, though they have appeared in the NWIT in 1992, 1993 and 1994, winning the title over SMU in 1993 and finishing as runner up to Oklahoma in the following year. They also have appeared in the successor to the NWIT named the WNIT in 1999, 2000, 2004, 2005, 2007, 2014, 2015, and 2016. As of the end of the 2015–16 season, the Red Wolves have an all-time record of 704–497. The Red Wolves have played in the Sun Belt Conference since 1991. Prior to that, they previously played in the AWISA from 1974 to 1982, the Southland Conference from 1982 to 1987 and American South from 1987 to 1991.

References

External links